Mimumesa littoralis  is a Palearctic species of solitary wasp.

References

External links
 Images representing Mimumesa littoralis 

Hymenoptera of Europe
Crabronidae
Insects described in 1934